Yadah is the third person singular qal form of the Hebrew language verbal root ydh.  Depending on its conjugation, it carries a range of meanings involving throwing or praising. 

In the qal form, it describes the "shooting" of arrows in Jeremiah 50:14. 
The piel form means "throwing" (as in throwing stones at a person, in Lamentations 3:53) or "casting down" ("the horns of the nations," in Zechariah 2:4). 
In the hiphil form, it normally means "praising" (usually in the context of ritual worship) and occasionally for confessing one's sins. 
The hitpael form has a similar range of meanings, but the word most often means "confession" and less commonly  "praise".

References

Hebrew words and phrases